A pro-sentence is a sentence where the subject pronoun has been dropped and therefore the sentence has a null subject.

Overview
Languages differ within this parameter, some languages such as Italian and Spanish have constant pro-drop, Finnish and Hebrew for example are partial pro-drop languages and Japanese and Tamil fall into the category of discourse or radical pro-drop languages. There are also languages such as English, German and Swedish that only allow pro-drop within very strict stylistic conditions. A pro-sentence is a kind of pro-form and is therefore anaphoric.

In English, yes, no and okay are common pro-sentences. In response to the question "Does Mars have two moons?", the sentence "Yes" can be understood to abbreviate "Mars does have two moons."

Pro-sentences are sometimes seen as grammatical interjections, since they are capable of very limited syntactical relations. But they can also be classified as a distinct part of speech, given that (other) interjections have meanings of their own and are often described as expressions of feelings or emotions.

Yes and no 

In some languages, the equivalents to yes and no may substitute not only a whole sentence, but also a part of it, either the subject and the verb, or the verb and a complement, and can also constitute a subordinate clause.

The Portuguese word sim (yes) gives a good example:

Q: Ela está em casa? A: Acredito que sim. — Q: Is she at home? A: I believe that she is (literally, that yes).
Ela não saiu de casa, mas o John sim. — She didn't leave home, but John did (literally, John yes).

In some languages, such as English, yes rebuts a negative question, whereas no affirms it. However, in Japanese, the equivalents of no (iie, uun, (i)ya) rebut a negative question, whereas the equivalents of yes (hai, ee, un) affirm it.

Q: Wakarimasen deshita ka (Did you not understand?)
A: Hai, wakarimasen deshita (No, I didn't — Literally That's right, I didn't understand)

Some languages have a specific word that rebuts a negative question. German has "doch"; French has "si"; Norwegian, Danish, and Swedish have jo, Hungarian has "de". The English words "yes" and "no" were originally only used to respond to negative questions, while "yea" and "nay" were the proper responses to affirmative questions; this distinction was lost at some time in Early Modern English. 

Q: Bist du nicht müde? (Aren't you tired?)
A: Doch. Ich gehe bald schlafen. (Yes. I'm about to go to sleep.)

In philosophy 
The prosentential theory of truth developed by Dorothy Grover, Nuel Belnap, and Joseph Camp, and defended more recently by Robert Brandom, holds that sentences like "p" is true and It is true that p should not be understood as ascribing properties to the sentence "p", but as a pro-sentence whose content is the same as that of "p." Brandom calls " . . .is true" a pro-sentence-forming operator.

See also

References

 Holmberg, A. 2001. 'The syntax of yes and no in Finnish.' Studia Linguistica 55: 141- 174.

Parts of speech